Love Is Dangerous is a 1933 American pre-Code comedy film directed by Richard Thorpe and starring John Warburton, Rochelle Hudson, Bradley Page, Judith Vosselli, and Dorothy Revier. The film is also known as Love Is Like That.

Plot
Gwendolyn, an 18-year-old girl, falls in love with Steve, a misogynistic bachelor, just upon seeing his picture. She manages to meet him, but he pushes her away. She then arranges to meet him again the same evening at the Steve's mother's house. Gwendolyn's sister, whose husband is extremely jealous, also goes there with a friend to teach her husband a lesson...

Cast
John Warburton as Steve
Rochelle Hudson as Gwendolyn
Bradley Page as Dean Scarsdale
Judith Vosselli as Emily Scarsdale
Dorothy Revier as Pat Ormsby
Albert Conti as R.J. Ormsby
Herta Lynd as Paula
May Beatty as Gloria
Lorin Raker as Tom

Production

References

External links

1933 films
American comedy films
1930s English-language films
Films directed by Richard Thorpe
Films scored by Raoul Kraushaar
1930s crime thriller films
American black-and-white films
1930s American films